The Euro-American Challenge - is an American football game that has been played annually since 2012 usually at the end of December. The game is organized by the Collegiate Development Football League.

Background
The Euro-American Challenge Game (EAC)  is the opening event with the CDFL’s National Scouting Showcase. The EAC is an annual event which pits the best available American free agent players (TEAM AMERICA) looking to sign a contract to play in North America or overseas against a selection of the top football players from across the continent of Europe (TEAM EUROPE). Football players including free agents and graduated seniors from the NCAA Division I Football Bowl Subdivision, NCAA Division I Football Championship, NCAA Division II, NCAA Division III and NAIA levels are eligible to participate. The Euro-American Challenge Game promotes American football as an International sport.

Game results

External links
 CDFL Official site
 Euro-American Challenge Official site

American football competitions